Rodeosuchus is an extinct genus of dyrosaurid crocodyliform known from the Paleocene Santa Lucía Formation of Bolivia. It contains a single species, Rodeosuchus machukiru.

References 

Dyrosaurids
Prehistoric pseudosuchian genera
Prehistoric marine crocodylomorphs
Fossil taxa described in 2021